Remco van Wijk (born October 7, 1972 in Breda) is a former Dutch field hockey player, who played 242 international matches for the Netherlands, in which he scored 63 goals. The striker made his debut for the Dutch on May 5, 1993 in a friendly match against Ireland (5-1). He retired from international tophockey after the 2002 Men's Hockey World Cup in Kuala Lumpur, Malaysia, and became a hockey coach in the summer of 2005, as an assistant at HC Den Bosch.

External links
 
 Dutch Hockey Federation

1972 births
Living people
Dutch male field hockey players
Male field hockey forwards
Dutch field hockey coaches
Olympic field hockey players of the Netherlands
Field hockey players at the 1996 Summer Olympics
1998 Men's Hockey World Cup players
Field hockey players at the 2000 Summer Olympics
2002 Men's Hockey World Cup players
Olympic gold medalists for the Netherlands
Sportspeople from Breda
Olympic medalists in field hockey

Medalists at the 2000 Summer Olympics
Medalists at the 1996 Summer Olympics
HC Bloemendaal players